Geithain railway station is a railway station in Geithain, Germany. The station is located on the Neukieritzsch–Chemnitz and Leipzig–Geithain lines. It is operated by DB Station&Service.

Services

Railway services 
Train services are currently operated by DB Regio and Mitteldeutsche Regiobahn, a subsidiary of Transdev Germany. As of 10 December 2017, the following services call at the station:

RE 6 and S6 operate hourly and usually connect to each other as S6 and both directions of RE 6 arrive and depart approximately at the same time. RB113 operates during peak hours hourly as well, all other times every 2 hours. RB113 arrives and departs about 30 minutes later than RE 6, which allows northbound connections from Geithain towards Bad Lausick and Leipzig every 30 minutes.

Local transport 
Many regional bus lines frequently stop at this station. The bus station is located near the railway station.

References

External links 
 

Railway stations in Saxony
railway station